Sentinel is an unincorporated community in Maricopa County, Arizona, United States.

The train station served the US Army training camps: Camp Horn and Camp Hyder during World War II.

Sentinel ruins
Some of the late 19th Century ruins in Sentinel.

See also

References

External links

Populated places in Maricopa County, Arizona